Unison Square Garden (stylized as UNISON SQUARE GARDEN, or USG) is a Japanese pop rock band signed to Toy's Factory. The band includes Kosuke Saito (vocals/guitar), Tomoya Tabuchi (bass/backing vocals), and Takao Suzuki (drums).

Career
In July 2004, the band was formed, and named as "unison" (ユニゾン) and later renamed the band name to "Unison Square Garden". They took part in Teens 'Music Festival Musical Instrument Store Competition, they won the Grand Prix finally. In 2008, they made a major debut at Toy's Factory. In February 2014, they gave their first performance on Music Station. In July, 2015, they released the anniversary album Dugout Accident, and held a concert in Nippon Budokan.

Discography

Singles

Studio albums

Mini albums

Anniversary albums

Compilation albums

Video albums

References

Japanese alternative rock groups
Japanese musical trios
Musical groups established in 2004
Toy's Factory artists